Rów Kunowski is a river of Poland that flows into Lake Miedwie.

Rivers of West Pomeranian Voivodeship
Stargard County